La Grenouillère is an 1869 oil on canvas painting by Pierre-Auguste Renoir, now in the Nationalmuseum in Stockholm. It shows the "camembert", a small island planted with a single tree, linked by gangplanks to the Île de la Grenouillère (left, out of picture) and to the fashionable La Grenouillère floating restaurant and boat-hire at Croissy-sur-Seine near Bougival. 

It was painted in the early days of Impressionism, at the same time as Claude Monet's Bain à la Grenouillère, with the two impoverished friends and fellow artists sitting side by side.

References

Paintings in the collection of the Nationalmuseum Stockholm
1869 paintings
Paintings by Pierre-Auguste Renoir
Maritime paintings